Danila, Dănilă or Dănila may refer to:

People 
 Danila (given name) , a given name
 Danila or Dănilă, a surname

Other uses 
 Dănila, a village in Dărmănești, Suceava, Romania